Morteza keyvan (1921, Isfahan – 19 October 1954, Tehran) was an Iranian poet, art critic, newspaper editor and political activist of the Tudeh Party of Iran.

After the coup d'état of 1953, Keyvan was arrested by the Pahlavi regime for hiding three fellow Tudeh Party members of the Tudeh Military Network in his house and later sentenced to death on accounts of "treason". 

He was executed by firing squad the same year on 19 October in the Qasr prison.

Keyvan was a friend and associate of many left-wing poets and writers of his time such as Ahmad Shamlou, Nima Youshij, Siavash Kasrai, Houshang Ebtehaj and many others. 

Shamlou, Ebtehaj, Kasrai, Youshij and Ehsan Tabri have written poems in the memory of his passing.

References

External link

1921 births
1954 deaths
20th-century Iranian poets
Executed communists
Iranian journalists
Iranian art critics
Tudeh Party of Iran members
Iranian communists
Iranian political writers
Iranian political journalists